Philip Towle is a British academic who is Emeritus Reader of International Relations at the University of Cambridge. He was formerly director of the Centre for International Studies at the University of Cambridge and served on the United Kingdom's delegations to the Conference of the Committee on Disarmament, the Seabed Treaty Review Conference, and the first UN Special Session on Disarmament. As an undergraduate, he studied at the University of Cambridge, and subsequently received an M.A. and Ph.D. from King's College, London.

Publications

References

External links
 Towle speaking at the Orient Research Centre (YouTube)

Living people
Alumni of the University of Cambridge
Alumni of King's College London
International relations scholars
Year of birth missing (living people)